Tadjenanet (arabe : تاجنانت, berbère: ⵜⴰⴵⵏⴰⵏⵜ), formerly called Saint-Donat, is a town and commune in Mila Province, Algeria.

At the 2008 census it had a population of 41,833.

Geography 
Tadjenanet is located 75 km south-west of Mila and 18 km from Chelghoum Laïd on the RN 5 connecting Algiers to Constantine. At an altitude of 850 m, it is crossed from West to East by the Oued Rhumel. 10 km to the south is the Ouled Abdennour forest, backed by the Djebel Rokbet ank Djmal. It is located 75 km from Constantine, 96 km from Batna, 56 km from Sétif and finally 23 km from the town of El Eulma, known for its wholesale market which generates significant trade flows. 20 km to the south is the wilaya of Batna.

Frontiers

History 
The colonial village of Saint-Donat was created in 1872 on the territory of the town of Oued Athmania on the edge of the Tadjenanet wadi, on the road from Algiers to Constantine.

Demography 
The city and its surroundings are home to various populations from different ethnicities, including the most important which is that of the Chaoui, after the independence of Algeria, several Berber tribes from the south including the province of Batna settled in the city and contributed to its development. Indeed, the vast majority of the inhabitants of Tadjenanet call themselves "Arabized" chaouis and consider that the city is in a sense an integral part of the Aurès, in particular in relation to the proximity of the wilaya of Batna. Its culture is similar to that found in the Aurès, especially with folklore, gastronomy and clothing style.

Economy 
The city is known especially by its weekly market of imported products, considered to be the first in eastern Algeria and which is the main cause of economic and social development of the city.

Administration

Sports 
The city of Tadjenanet has a DRB Tadjenanet football team which has succeeded in having it represented in elite football in Algeria by entering the National Division 1 for the first time in its history (in 2015), and now the team is conquering in the National division 2 (since 2019).

Maps

References

Communes of Mila Province
Cities in Algeria
Algeria